The Leonard Davis Institute of Health Economics (LDI) is the center for health services research, health policy, and health care management education at the University of Pennsylvania. It is based in the Colonial Penn Center on Locust Walk, at the heart of Penn's campus. 

The focus of the LDI is on the organization, delivery, financing and management of health care and the social forces that shape health.  LDI aims to improve health through multidisciplinary studies of the medical, economic, social, and ethical issues that influence it.  

The LDI is a formal collaborative venture among Penn's schools of Medicine (Perelman), Business (Wharton), Nursing, Communication (Annenberg), Law, and Dental Medicine along with The University of Pennsylvania Health System and The Children's Hospital of Philadelphia. Associated faculty members and distinguished Senior Fellows hail from a wide variety of disciplines.

The LDI was established in 1967, enabled by the support of Leonard Davis and his wife, Sophie Davis. Leonard Davis was one of the innovators in private health insurance. As the founder of Colonial Penn, Mr. Davis pioneered insurance plans for the elderly.  He was also a strong advocate for the establishment of the American Association of Retired Persons (AARP), and was also closely involved in the congressional development of Medicare legislation.

References

University of Pennsylvania
1967 establishments in Pennsylvania
Educational institutions established in 1967